Queen Sirikit National Convention Center (QSNCC) (Thai: ศูนย์การประชุมแห่งชาติสิริกิติ์) or also known simply as Queen Sirikit Convention Center, is a convention center and exhibition hall in Bangkok, Thailand. The center is regarded as a public asset according to the Thai Ministry of Finance's Treasury Department.  However, it has been managed by N.C.C. Management & Development Co., Ltd., a private firm, since its opening in 1991. The QSNCC was built to host events, especially conferences and exhibitions and has hosted numerous international events. The QSNCC is also home to the Plenary Hall, a theatre style hall, which has a capacity of 6,000 persons.

History
In September 1987, Suthee Singhasaneh, the Minister of Finance, and Kamchorn Sathirakul, the Bank of Thailand Governor jointly signed a deal between the Royal Thai Government and the World Bank/International Monetary Fund (IMF) to host the 46th Annual Meeting of the Boards of Governors of the World Bank Group and IMF in Bangkok between 1 October to 15 October 1991.  As a result, the QSNCC was constructed as a sign of Thailand's commitment to host this event. As for the architectural design, a leading Thai architectural firm was assigned to design a structure that reflected Thai culture and heritage for the QSNCC.

To ensure that the center would be completed on time, a design-build delivery system was used and the construction started in late 1989. Construction began with 100 designers and more than 1000 construction workers. The bulk of construction was finished by June 1991, under budget and about two months before the scheduled date of August 1991. It was finished in only 16 months. Projects of this magnitude normally take 40 months.

On 29 August 1991, King Bhumibol Adulyadej and Queen Sirikit officially opened the Queen Sirikit National Convention Center.  The center was named after Queen Sirikit in honour of her 60th birthday.

The convention center was closed for a 12 billion baht renovation on 26 April 2019 and reopen on 12 September 2022 with three times the original venue space.

On 9 February 2022, Queen Sirikit National Convention Center was selected as the main meeting venue of APEC Thailand 2022 which will be held between 16-19 November 2022.

Expo
 46th Annual Meeting of the Boards of Governors of the World Bank Group and IMF
 1st ASEAN Seafood Expo & Conference
 Miss Universe 1992
 APEC Thailand 2022

Gallery

References

Buildings and structures in Bangkok
Convention centers in Thailand
Tourist attractions in Bangkok
Khlong Toei district
Buildings and structures completed in 1991
1991 establishments in Thailand